Rovina may refer to:

 Rovina, Bulgaria, a village in the municipality of Smolyan, Bulgaria
 Hanna Rovina (1892–1980), Israeli actress
 Rovina, a village in Brănișca Commune, Hunedoara County, Romania
 Rovina, a village in Bucureșci Commune, Hunedoara County, Romania